"Heat" is a song by American singer Kelly Clarkson, from her eighth studio album, Meaning of Life (2017). Originally written and produced by the production duo The Monarch, the final version of the track is co-written and co-produced by Mick Schultz with additional writing by Michael Pollack and production by American singer Harlœ and vocal production by Jesse Shatkin. Atlantic Records released the song as the album's third single on July 27, 2018, with a remix version by British DJ Luke Solomon. It reached number one on the US Billboard Dance Club Songs chart in March 2019. It also received critical acclaim. The song was featured in the Netflix show Soundtrack.

Background and composition 
"Heat" was originally written by the production duo The Monarch and Michael Pollack for Clarkson's debut album for Atlantic Records. According to Mick Schultz, Atlantic chairman and CEO Craig Kallman and A&R manager Carrie West approached him and his frequent collaborator Harlœ to re-produce the track after finishing recording another song, "Medicine", for Clarkson. He described the original recording as "rock and soulful", and ultimately produced two versions of it. He recalled that the process took days, remarking: "They (Atlantic) told me they wanted something out of the box, so I tried to really think about doing something left field. I ended up with (the version) that's on the album now." Schultz and Harlœ later received co-writing credits for the track. An uptempo soul number, Clarkson described its lyrics as giving a full commitment to a relationship. Rolling Stone contributor Maura Johnston described its music as recalling the "upbeat soul-tinged hits of the Nineties while possessing a decidedly 21st-century energy". AllMusic senior editor Stephen Thomas Erlewine also noted that the song has a "bit of gospel fire", while Spins Katherine St. Asaph compared it to Adele's collaborations with Max Martin.

Release and reception 
In an interview with the Official Charts Company, Clarkson revealed plans to release "Heat" as a follow-up single from Meaning of Life. A remix by British DJ Luke Solomon was released by Atlantic as a single on July 27, 2018. A fan video was released on August 1, 2018, featuring Clarkson singing and dancing over the track accompanied by self-recorded footage of various enthusiasts performing their versions of it.

"Heat" received a positive response from music critics upon the release of Meaning of Life. Idolator's Mike Wass called the track the best song on the album, while Shaun Kitchener of the Daily Express praised the sheer confidence Clarkson exudes on the track. Reviewing for The Observer, Michael Cragg described the song as a "pure unadulterated joy".

Live performances
Clarkson recorded a live performance of "Heat" in 2017 as part of her "Nashville Sessions" series at the War Memorial Auditorium in Nashville, Tennessee, which was later released on July 11, 2018. She also filmed a live performance of the track at the "Rocking and Stockings" content series sponsored by American chain store Cracker Barrel to promote the album during the 2017 holiday season. Clarkson presented the song in a live television performance at The Today Show on June 8, 2018. She has then included it on a medley presentation at the 2018 Radio Disney Music Awards and has also performed the track at the Macy's 4th of July Fireworks Spectacular holiday special on July 4, 2018. On August 27, 2018, Clarkson opended the 2018 US Open, with a medley of her hits which included the song. Clarkson performed the song during the 92nd Annual Macy's Thanksgiving Day Parade on November 22, 2018. She broke Macy's tradition by singing the vocals live rather than lip syncing to the track. She also performed the song on The Voice on December 4, 2018, and on NBC's New Year's Eve. Clarkson was featured singing the song on episode 4 of The Morning Show which premiered on Apple TV+ on November 9, 2019.

Track listing 

Digital streaming – Luke Solomon Remix 

Digital streaming – Single

Digital streaming – Niko the Kid Remix

Digital streaming – Paul Morrell Remix

Digital streaming – Easy Star All-Stars & Michael Goldwasser Reggae Remix

Digital streaming – Wolves by Night Remix

Digital streaming – Bynon Remix

Personnel 
Credits lifted the album's liner notes.

 Lead vocals – Kelly Clarkson
 Background vocals – Nicole Hurst, Bridget Sarai, Jessica Karpov
 Producers – The Monarch, Mick Schultz
 Vocal producers – Jesse Shatkin, Jessica Karpov, The Monarch
 Mixing engineer – John Hanes
 Mastering engineers – Chris Gehringer, Will Quinnell

 Engineers –  Iain Findlay, Jesse Shatkin, Mick Schultz, Todd Tidwell, Steve Churchyard
 Guitars – Eric Peterson
 Bass – Brian Schultz
 Mixer	– Serban Ghenea
 Programmer – Mick Shultz, The Monarch

Charts

Weekly charts

Year-end charts

Release history

References 

2017 songs
2018 singles
Atlantic Records singles
Kelly Clarkson songs
Song recordings produced by Jesse Shatkin
Songs written by Mick Schultz
Songs written by Michael Pollack (musician)
Songs written by Jessica Ashley
Songs written by Andre Davidson
Songs written by Sean Davidson
Song recordings produced by the Monarch (production team)